Eugenia is a genus of flowering plants in the myrtle family Myrtaceae. It has a worldwide, although highly uneven, distribution in tropical and subtropical regions. The bulk of the approximately 1,100 species occur in the New World tropics, especially in the northern Andes, the Caribbean, and the Atlantic Forest (coastal forests) of eastern Brazil. Other centers of diversity include New Caledonia and Madagascar. Many of the species that occur in the Old World have received a new classification into the genus Syzygium.

All species are woody evergreen trees and shrubs. Several are grown as ornamental plants for their attractive glossy foliage, and a few produce edible fruit that are eaten fresh or used in jams and jellies.

Taxonomy
The genus was named in honor of Prince Eugene of Savoy.

Many species new to science have been and are in the process of being described from these regions. For example, 37 new species of Eugenia have been described from Mesoamerica in the past few years. At least 20 new species are currently in the process of being described from New Caledonia, and approximately the same number of species new to science may occur in Madagascar. Despite the enormous ecological importance of the myrtle family in Australia (e.g. Eucalyptus, Corymbia, Angophora, Melaleuca, Callistemon, Rhodamnia, Gossia), only one species of Eugenia, E. reinwardtiana, occurs on that continent. The genus also is represented in Africa south of the Sahara, but it is relatively species-poor on that continent. In the past some botanists included the morphologically similar Old World genus Syzygium in Eugenia, but research by Rudolf Schmid in the early 1970s convinced most botanists that the genera are easily separable. Research by van Wyk and colleagues in South Africa suggests the genus may comprise at least two major lineages, recognizable by anatomical and other features.

Molecular phylogenetic studies have changed the historical circumscription of the genus. Many species formerly placed in Eugenia have been moved to Syzygium. Two others have been reassigned to Pimenta. The Caribbean genera Hottea, Calyptrogenia and Pseudanamomis were shown to be embedded in Eugenia. The monotypic Indian genus Meteoromyrtus was also found to be part of Eugenia.

Species 

Selected species include:

Ecology
Eugenia species are sometimes used as food plants by the larvae of hepialid moths of the genera Aenetus (including A. splendens) and Endoclita (including E. damor and E. malabaricus). Aenetus species burrow horizontally into the trunk then vertically down. Other Lepidoptera larvae which feed on Eugenia include Eupseudosoma aberrans and the snowy eupseudosoma.

References

 
Taxa named by Carl Linnaeus
Pantropical flora